Lisa St Aubin de Terán (born 2 October 1953) is an English novelist, writer of autobiographical fictions, and memoirist. Her father was the Guyanese writer and academic Jan Carew.

Life and career
Lisa St Aubin de Terán was born in 1953 to Joan Mary Murray, (nee St Aubin) and Jan Rynveld Carew and brought up in Clapham in South London. She attended James Allen's Girls' School. Her memoir, Hacienda (1998), describes how she fell into a whirlwind first marriage at the age of 16 to an exiled Venezuelan aristocrat and bank robber, Jaime Terán, and lived for seven years at a remote farm in the Andean region of Venezuela. She fled both the marriage and Venezuela after he suggested she and their infant daughter join him in a suicide pact.

After returning to Britain, she married her second husband, the Scottish poet and novelist George MacBeth in 1982. It was also in that year she published her first novel, Keepers of the House, winning her the Somerset Maugham Award and a place on Granta'''s list of "Best of Young British Novelists" (1983, issue #7). The Slow Train to Milan, winner of the John Llewellyn Rhys Prize, followed in 1983. In the same year she moved to Wiggenhall St. Mary Magdalen in Norfolk. After her second marriage broke down she left to live in Italy.

Her third husband was the painter Robbie Duff Scott whom she had first met when George MacBeth asked him to paint a portrait of her. After marriage in 1989 she and Duff Scott moved to Umbria, describing her life there in Venice: The Four Seasons (1992) and A Valley in Italy (1994).
 
In 1994, she presented "Santos to Santa Cruz", an episode of the BBC television series Great Railway Journeys travelling from Brazil to Bolivia, and wrote an accompanying article for The Times. Later in 1998 she visited Lake Garda and Lake Maggiore for an episode of the BBC Radio 4 documentary The Off Season.

In 2001 Duff Scott and de Terán separated and by 2003 de Terán had moved to Amsterdam and set up her own film production company called Radiant Pictures, through which she met her new partner, Dutch cameraman, Mees van Deth. A year later the couple moved to in Mossuril, Nampula Province, Mozambique.

Lisa St Aubin de Terán has three children, including by her first husband a daughter, Iseult Teran, who is also a novelist.

The Terán Foundation

In 2004 Lisa St Aubin de Terán established The Terán Foundation to help poor villages in northern Mozambique. She writes about this phase of her life in Mozambique Mysteries (2007). The Terán Foundation's first project, The College of Tourism and Agriculture (CTCA) in Cabaceira Grande, operated between 2004 and 2010 before it was sold back to the government. A second restaurant and guest house, Sunset Boulevard, functions on a non-profit basis as a training facility in Mossuril. The third building project, The Leopard Spot, was earmarked for construction in Milange, on the border with Malawi.

 Awards 

 Bibliography 
In addition to her books, Lisa St Aubin de Terán has written, primarily as a travel journalist, for The Observer, The Guardian, The Daily Telegraph, The Times, The Independent, The New York Times, The Mail on Sunday, New Statesman, Vanity Fair, Marie Claire and Cosmopolitan amongst others.

 Books 

 Selected essays 

Further reading
Author's website
The Teran Foundation
Author biography and profile at British Council
1984 interview in The Daily Telegraph1987 interview in The Daily Telegraph1990 interview in The Sunday Telegraph1990 interview in The Sunday Times1992 interview in The Daily Telegraph1993 interview in The Guardian1997 interview in The Daily Telegraph2002 interview in The Sunday Times2003 interview in The TimesIn the Psychiatrist's Chair (interview on BBC Radio 4 in 1993)Everywoman'': "A Whirlwind Affair" (interview on the BBC World Service in 2002)
Portuguese fan website
Portuguese fan collection of Lisa St Aubin de Terán reviews

References

1953 births
English women novelists
English memoirists
John Llewellyn Rhys Prize winners
Living people
People educated at James Allen's Girls' School
British women memoirists
English women non-fiction writers
People from King's Lynn and West Norfolk (district)
English people of Guyanese descent
British expatriates in Mozambique
British women travel writers
British travel writers
English expatriates in the Netherlands